Winchester's Military Museums are a group of six independent and related regimental museums in Peninsula Barracks and Lower Barracks in Winchester, Hampshire.

The museums are:

 HorsePower: The Museum of the King's Royal Hussars
 Royal Hampshire Regiment Museum in Serle's House
 Royal Green Jackets (Rifles) Museum
 The Gurkha Museum
 Museum of the Adjutant General's Corps  also known as The Adjutant General's Corps (AGC) Museum
 The Rifles Museum

References

External links
 Winchester's Military Museums - official site
 HorsePower
 Royal Green Jackets (Rifles) Museum
 Royal Hampshire Regiment Museum
 The Gurkha Museum
 The AGC Museum
 The Rifles Museum

Museums in Winchester
Regimental museums in England